Hope Falls is a hamlet located in the Town of Hope in Hamilton County, New York, United States. Hope Falls is situated in the narrow valley of the East Stony Creek, approximately three miles above its mouth into the Great Sacandaga Lake.

References

Hamlets in Hamilton County, New York
Hamlets in New York (state)